Kwon Mi-sook is a female former international table tennis player from South Korea.

Table tennis career
She won a silver medal for South Korea at the 1989 World Table Tennis Championships in the Corbillon Cup (women's team event) with Hong Soon-hwa, Hyun Jung-hwa and Kim Young-mi.

She retired from playing at the age of 22 and later became the head coach of the Philippines women's table tennis team in February 2014.

See also
 List of World Table Tennis Championships medalists

References

South Korean female table tennis players
1972 births
Living people
World Table Tennis Championships medalists